The 1998 Chilean telethon (December 4-5, 1988) was the 15th version of the solidarity campaign conducted in Chile. The theme of this version was "We All Matter." Happily surpassing the target, raising CL$ 6,029,912,577 (Total at 00:57 on December 6, delivered at the National Stadium of Chile). the poster girl was Scarlett Barrientos. This edition was performed after 24 months without Telethon, because in December 1997 Chilean parliamentary elections were held.

As a curiosity, TVN had a strike during the buildup to the show. It was due to proposed salary reductions affecting all employees of the state channel. The strike caused Channel 13 to send their cameramen to cover the transmission with TVN cameras, otherwise it would have had to suspend nearly half of the show. Mario Kreutzberger, in an interview on Teletrece, thanked Channel 13 for carrying out this action. However, state television reached an agreement at 0:00 on December 6, 1998, almost when the Telethon was finished.

It was also the teleton's 20th anniversary year.

Two countries with the same dream 
It was a coincidence that year that just as Chile was making the 15th Telethon, in Mexico on the same day the 2nd edition of the Mexican Telethon was being made, with the famous artist and singer Lucero as leading entertainer. This permitted three contacts to be made between the two programs via satellite, these link-ups were made at 03:00, 11:30, and 18:30, Chile Summer Time (GMT-3), on December 5. During these links, both countries mutually dedicated songs of encouragement to motivate both the Chilean and the Mexican public, in addition the entertainers exchanged information about the progress of their collections.

Computing

Sponsors

Artists

National singers 
  Illapu
  Myriam Hernández
   Adrián y los Dados Negros
  Mala Junta
  Alberto Plaza
  Luis Jara
  Sexual Democracia
  Chancho en Piedra
  Nicole
  Javiera Parra
  Canal Magdalena
  La Sociedad
  Lucho Gatica
  Lorena
  Rachel
  Douglas
  Sonora Palacios
  Los Bandoleros de Teno

International singers 
   Gloria Estefan
   Paolo Meneguzzi
  Vikki Carr
  Pimpinela
  Charlie Zaa
  Antonio Ríos
  El Símbolo
  Carlos Ponce
  Sandy y Papo
  Chris Durán
  Ilegales
  Raul Di Blasio
  Chichí Peralta
  Ataque 77
  Celia Cruz
   Ricardo Montaner
  Ana Bárbara
  Marco Antonio Solís

Comedians 
 Coco Legrand
 Álvaro Salas
 CNN Carlos Nuñez
 Luciano Bello
 La Vicky y la Gaby
 Jorge "Chino" Navarrete
 Bombo Fica
 Hermogenes Conache
 Checho Hirane
 Ricardo Meruane
 Che Copete

Children's section 
 Cachureos
 Profesor Rossa
 Los Tachuelas
 Mundo Mágico

Adult's section 
 Miss Telethon was held on 98, the candidates were:
 Andrea Ramírez
 Gloria Aros
 Jessica Abudinen
 Pachi
 Rocío Ravest
 Carla Ochoa
 Ingrid Cruz
 Helvecia Viera as Rica Evangelista

Transmission 
 Telenorte
 Canal 2
 La Red
 UCV Televisión
 Televisión Nacional de Chile
 Megavisión
 Chilevisión
 Universidad Católica de Chile Televisión

References

External links 
 
 

Telethon
Chilean telethons